John Miller (1878 – unknown) was a Scottish professional footballer who played as a winger.

References

1878 births
Year of death unknown
Scottish footballers
Association football wingers
Burnley F.C. players
English Football League players
Footballers from Glasgow
People from Maryhill